Kim Su-hyeon, Kim Soo-hyun, or Kim Su-hyon is the name of:

 Kim Soo-hyun (writer) (born 1943), South Korean writer
 Kim Su-hyeon (actor, born 1970), South Korean actor
 Claudia Kim (born 1985, Korean name Kim Soo-hyun), South Korean actress
 Kim Soo-hyun (born 1988), South Korean actor
 Kim Su-hyeon (weightlifter) (born 1995), South Korean weightlifter

See also
Kim So-hyun